Slavko Löwy (August 7, 1904 – April 1, 1996) was a Croatian architect.

Background, family and education
Löwy was born in Koprivnica to a respectable and wealthy Croatian Jewish family, who were engaged in trade. In Koprivnica he attended the gymnasium school, and after graduation in 1923, he was enrolled in the Vienna Technical College. After four semesters, in 1925 he continued his studies in Zagreb at the department of architecture in Royal Technical College. In 1927 he continued his education in Dresden, where he graduated in 1930.

Career

Löwy moved to Zagreb, in 1930, where he started working in the architectural studio of Ignjat Fischer. In 1931 in collaboration with Vlado Antolić, Löwy starts a tender for the city Savings Bank project in Sarajevo. That same year he moved into the architectural studio of Stanko Kliske. Löwy became a licensed architect in 1931, and that same year he established his own architectural studio, „Löwy“. That same year he performed his first self-derived house in Petrić street 7, at the space of the former Zagreb Trust block. He married his wife Terezija Rakić in 1932, and on November 8, 1933 Löwy son Miroslav was born.

Löwy realized his most important achievement in 1933, the nine floors skyscraper in Masarykova street, which will be called the "first skyscraper of Zagreb". He moved his architectural studio, in 1934, at the top floor of that same skyscraper, in Masarykova street, that he designed. From 1934 until 1941 Löwy implemented a number of major housing and business establishments in Zagreb, which belong to the very top of Croatian modernism.

In 1945 he started to work on reconstruction of the Nama department stores in Croatia, Slovenia and Bosnia and Herzegovina. In 1946 Löwy was forcibly moved by communists regime to the Bureau of Architecture project (APZ), where he worked on the types of "rational residential buildings. Since 1950 until 1953 he was also forcibly moved to Macedonia, Skopje, where he designed the public buildings. Apartment with his studio, in Masarykova street, were returned to him in 1953 when he returned to Zagreb. After return Löwy renewed his studio in the original space. In 1962 the "Architectural firm Löwy" is merged with "Tehnoprojekt".

Personal life
In 1942 the work of Löwy architectural studio was prohibited by Nazis and NDH regime. Apartment with his studio, in Masarykova street, was taken away from him, and most project documentation of his studio has been destroyed. Löwy parents were immediately deported to Nazi death camps, and he somehow survived while hiding in Zagreb, one of his hiding places was truss of Art Pavilion in Zagreb. Surviving members of his family claim that Löwy has changed, in that period, as many as 17 locations in Zagreb as he hide from Nazis and NDH regime. After the World War II things were not much better for Löwy. Under communists regime of newly founded SFR Yugoslavia he had a problems for being a Jew, but his acquaintance with sculptor Augustinčić partially helped him through those times.

Retirement and death
He retired in 1966. In 1970 he was awarded with the prize of Viktor Kovačić for a lifetime achievement, and in 1977 he was also awarded with the prize of Vladimir Nazor for a lifetime achievement.

Löwy died on April 1, 1996 on the 9th floor of his apartment and studio skyscraper in Masarykova Street.

Works

Zagreb

 Residential and commercial building Grünsberg, Petrićeva 7, 1932–1933.
 Residential and commercial building Schlenger, Bogovićeva 4, 1932–1933.
 Hirschler residential house, Gornje Prekrižje 2, 1932–1933.
 Nossan residential house, Zvonimirova 23, 1932–1933.
 Residential and commercial building Radovan, Masarykova 22, 1933. – 1934.
 Polak residential house, Tuškanova 15, 1936. – 1937.
 Lebinec residential house, Ribnjak 20, 1936. – 1937.
 Federbuš residential house, Novakova 19, 1936. – 1937.
 Residential and commercial building Schlenger, Boškovićeva 7b, 1936. – 1937.
 Wiener Bankverein residential house, Bulićeva 4, 1936. – 1937.
 Residential and commercial building Jadranskog osiguravajućeg društva, Draškovićeva 13, 1936. – 1937.
 Residential and commercial building Radovan, Savska 8, 1937.
 Beck residential house, Vinkovićeva 8, 1937.
 Prpić residential house, Solovljeva 22, 1938.
 Marko Kasumović villa, Njegoševa 1, 1936. - 1938.
 Löwy residential house, Mandrovićeva 12, 1938. – 1939.
 Bukovačka 149, 1941.
 Pichler residential house, Grškovićeva 7, 1941.
 Master workshop Vanje Radauša, Zmajevac 8, 1949.
 Master workshop Antuna Augustinčića, Jabukovac 10, 1949.
 Residential buildings factory „Rade Končar“, Gajnice, 1949.
 Residential buildings, Galjufova 4 – 12, 1949.
 Steiner residential house, Grškovićeva 25, 1955.
 Dorm „Cvjetno naselje“, Odranska 8, 1955.
 Nursing home „Lavoslav Švarc“, Bukovačka 55, 1955. – 1956.
 Economics institute, Kennedyjev trg 7, 1957. – 1963.
 Restaurant „Trnjanka“, Trnjanska cesta 31, 1959. – 1960.
 Dorm „Ante Starčević“, Ljubljanska avenija 2, 1961.
 Dorm „Stjepan Radić“, Horvoćanska cesta/ Jarunska cesta 2, 1961.

Croatia

 Arrangement of the Jewish cemetery, Koprivnica, 1930.
 Memorial to the Jews who died in World War I in the town of Koprivnica cemetery, Koprivnica, 1930.
 Löwy family tomb, Koprivnica, 1930.
 Remaking of the Koprivnica Synagogue, 1937.
 Elektroprimorje administration building, Viktora Cara Emina 2, Rijeka, 1953. – 1955.
 Central substation, Grohovčeva 2, Rijeka, 1960.
 Dorm, I. G. Kovačića 4, Osijek, 1962.
 Dorm Podmurvica, Čandekova 4, Rijeka, 1963.
 Excursion forest management „Crna Gora“, Koprivnica, 1970.
 Residential family house Švarc, Krešimirov trg 5, Koprivnica, 1973.
 Memorial to the Jews who died in World War I in the town of Koprivnica cemetery, (modification of the monument from 1930.)

Other countries

 The city public beach, Skopje, Macedonia, 1950–1951
 Student village, Skopje, Macedonia, 1950–1951
 Administrative centre, Skopje, Macedonia, 1952–1953
 Disabled persons home, Skopje, Macedonia, 1953
 City hotel with a Vardar promenade Vardar, Skopje, Macedonia
 Department store, Skopje, Macedonia, 1957
 Federal Chamber of Commerce building, Belgrade, Serbia, 1958–1965

References

Bibliography

 

1904 births
1996 deaths
People from Koprivnica
Croatian Jews
Austro-Hungarian Jews
Croatian Austro-Hungarians
Jewish architects
20th-century Croatian architects